was a Japanese samurai of the Sengoku period. He was a castle commander of Kuroi Castle. 
He was a retainer of Inaba Ittetsu, but later joined Akechi Mitsuhide. 

Oda Nobunaga was not pleased that Toshimitsu chose to work under Mitsuhide, and if not for Mitsuhide's intervention Nobunaga would have killed him.

Toshimitsu was also vital for the Akechi action at Honnō-ji and the Battle of Yamazaki. 

He was the father of the Lady Kasuga, who became a preeminent retainer of the Tokugawa Shogunate.

See also
 Saito Toshikazu

Notes

External links

Saito Toshimitsu entry at Samurai Wiki

Samurai
1534 births
1582 deaths
Akechi clan
Toshimitsu